Christopher Reich is a Swiss American author.

Christopher Reich was born in Tokyo on November 12, 1961, son to Willy Wolfgang Reich and Mildred Reich. His family moved to the United States in 1965. He graduated undergrad from Georgetown University and went on to study business at the University of Texas. He lived and worked in Switzerland as an investment banker before moving to Austin, Texas to author his first novel. Titled Numbered Account, it went on to sell over 1 million copies. He has since authored 12 more novels, many of which have appeared on the NYT Bestseller list. He is a father to two daughters, Noëlle and Katja Reich, and currently resides in Southern California.

Bibliography

 Numbered Account (1998) — Appeared on NYT Bestseller listings.  Over one million copies sold.  Translated into twenty-three languages.
 The Runner (2000) - The Times Bestseller.
 The First Billion (2002) - Appeared on NYT Bestseller List
 The Devil's Banker (2003)
 The Patriots' Club (2004) — Winner of the 2006 International Thriller Writers Award for best novel.
 Rules of Deception (2008) - Debuted at #3 on New York Times Bestseller List
 Rules of Vengeance (2009) - New York Times Bestseller
 Rules of Betrayal (2010) -  New York Times Bestseller
 The Prince of Risk (2013)
 Invasion Of Privacy (2015)
 The Take (2018)
 Crown Jewel (2019)
 The Palace (2020)
 Once a Thief (2022) - NY Post Top Releases, Amazon Best Books of 2022

Short Story
 Assassins (2006) Anthology Thriller (book)

References

External links
 Official site 

1961 births
American thriller writers
Georgetown University alumni
University of Texas at Austin alumni
Living people
American people of Swiss descent
Japanese expatriates in the United States
American male novelists